Valeriy Vitalevich Sviatokha (born 20 July 1981) is a Belarusian hammer thrower. His personal best throw is 81.49 metres, achieved in May 2006 in Brest.

He won the bronze medal at the 2005 Summer Universiade. He also competed at the 2008 Olympic Games without reaching the final. When he took part in the 2012 Summer Olympics he reached the final, finishing in 11th place.

Achievements

References

1981 births
Living people
Belarusian male hammer throwers
Athletes (track and field) at the 2008 Summer Olympics
Athletes (track and field) at the 2012 Summer Olympics
Olympic athletes of Belarus
Sportspeople from Grodno
Universiade medalists in athletics (track and field)
Universiade bronze medalists for Belarus
Medalists at the 2005 Summer Universiade